"What My World Spins Around" is a song by American country music singer Jordan Davis. It was released in June 2022 as the second single from his second studio album, Bluebird Days. He co-wrote it with Ryan Hurd and Matt Dragstrem.

Content
According to Billboard, Davis wrote the song during a session with songwriters Ryan Hurd and Matt Dragstrem. Davis told the publication he was holding a conversation about the changes that had ensued in his life since his marriage, and provided the title "What My World Spins Around" to the other two. They then assembled a demo, which they took to Davis's producer, Paul DiGiovanni. DiGiovanni noted that he had difficulty coming up with a sound for the song due to it using only two chords. One production choice he made was to use a second guitar effect atop the guitar work of session musician Derek Wells to create a tremolo effect. Jeremy Chua of Taste of Country described the song as a "jaunty, feel-good tune".

Charts

Weekly charts

Year-end charts

References

2022 singles
2022 songs
Jordan Davis (singer) songs
Songs written by Jordan Davis (singer)
Songs written by Matt Dragstrem
Songs written by Ryan Hurd
MCA Nashville Records singles